Reata Restaurant is a Texas cuisine-based restaurant group founded by Al Micallef with operating interests in Alpine and Fort Worth, Texas. The Reata Restaurant Group has operated its flagship restaurant in the old Caravan of Dreams since May 2002. Reata at the Rodeo, Reata at the Backstage, and La Espuela Mexican Cantina are Reata-run restaurants at the annual Fort Worth Stock Show and Rodeo for 3 weeks starting in mid-January through the beginning of February. In addition, they provide an event production catering service called Reata on the Road. Reata also produces a line of gourmet bakeware and a cookbook – "Reata: Legendary Texas Cooking".

History
The restaurant was founded by Al Micallef in Alpine, Texas, in 1995. The name Reata, Spanish for rope, was inspired by the novel Giant by Edna Ferber. In 1996, Reata opened its second location in Fort Worth, Texas, on the 35th floor of the Bank One Tower. Following the F3 tornado on March 28, 2000, Reata was hit and forced to close. Within 6 weeks, the restaurant was rebuilt and operational in the original location that was hit by the tornado. In January 2001, the restaurant was once again forced to close and re-opened in May 2002 in the building previously known as the Caravan of Dreams.

In February 2001, between the time Reata had to close in the Bank One Tower and re-open in Sundance Square, Reata started a catering division with a 3000sq. ft. commercial kitchen called Reata on the Road. In 2002, Reata opened a facility called Reata at the Rodeo, located in the Amon Carter Exhibits Hall to serve the Fort Worth Stock Show and Rodeo. In 2007, Reata took over operation of the Backstage Club at the Fort Worth Stock Show and Rodeo, renaming it Reata at the Backstage Club.
In the fall of 2008, a cookbook, authored by Mike Micallef, was released called "Reata: Legendary Texas Cooking". This cookbook is sold through Amazon and the Reata Store. In January 2010, Reata opened a Mexican cuisine based Restaurant at the Fort Worth Stock Show and Rodeo called La Espuela.

Chefs
Notable chefs that started their careers at the Reata include Grady Spears, Tim Love, Brian Olenjack, and Tod Phillips.

Locations

 Reata Fort Worth Sundance Square, Fort Worth, Texas
 Reata at the Rodeo (operated during the Fort Worth Stock Show and Rodeo)
 Reata at the Backstage Club (operated during the Fort Worth Stock Show and Rodeo)
 LaEspuela (operated during the Fort Worth Stock Show and Rodeo)
 Reata Alpine, Alpine, Texas

References

Companies based in Fort Worth, Texas
Restaurants established in 1995
Regional restaurant chains in the United States
Restaurants in Texas
1995 establishments in Texas